The rivière aux Ormes (in English: Elm River) is a tributary of the east bank of the Petite rivière du Chêne which empties on the south bank of the St. Lawrence River. The Rivière des Ormes flows through the municipalities of Villeroy (MRC L'Érable Regional County Municipality), Sainte-Françoise and Fortierville, in the Bécancour Regional County Municipality, in the administrative region of Centre-du-Québec, in Quebec, in Canada.

Geography 
The main hydrographic slopes near the "Rivière aux Ormes" are:
 north side: Petite rivière du Chêne, L'Espérance stream, rivière du Chêne, St. Lawrence River;
 east side: northern arm of the rivière aux Ormes, rivière du Chêne, Creuse river;
 south side: Petite rivière du Chêne, Creuse river, Gentilly River, Bécancour River;
 west side: Petite rivière du Chêne, St. Lawrence River, rivière aux Orignaux, rivière aux Glaises.

The "rivière aux Ormes" originates north of highway 20, near exit 253.

  north-west, in Villeroy, to the "route du rang 16e Ouest";
  north-west, up to a country road;
  to the north-west, to the municipal limit between Villeroy and Sainte-Françoise;
  north-west, up to the tenth rang road;
  north, to the limit between the municipalities of Sainte-Françoise and Fortierville;
  north, to the confluence of the northern arm of the rivière aux Ormes;
  north, to a country road;
  west, to its confluence.

The Ormes river flows on the east bank of the Petite rivière du Chêne. Its confluence is located at the limit between the municipalities of Fortierville and Parisville.

Toponymy 
The toponym “Rivière aux Ormes” was made official on December 5, 1968, at the Commission de toponymie du Québec.

See also 

 List of rivers of Quebec

References 

Rivers of Centre-du-Québec